Muñoz ( or ) is a Spanish-language surname—with a Portuguese-language variant (Munhoz), from Basque "muinoa" (Hill), the surname got expanded during the Reconquista with massive settlements done by citizens from Navarre and Álava in New Castile and Andalusia.

Geographical distribution
As of 2014, 26.7% of all known bearers of the surname Muñoz were residents of Colombia (1:129), 21.1% of Spain (1:158), 20.3% of Chile (1:62), 6.7% of Argentina (1:458), 5.7% of Peru (1:397), 5.7% of Venezuela (1:379), 2.2% of Guatemala (1:533), 1.7% of Cuba (1:495), 1.6% of the Philippines (1:4,544), 1.6% of Nicaragua (1:272), 1.4% of Panama (1:206), 1.3% of Costa Rica (1:255) and 1.1% of the Dominican Republic (1:674).

In Spain, the frequency of the surname was higher than national average (1:158) in the following autonomous communities:
 1. Castilla-La Mancha (1:96)
 2. Andalusia (1:98)
 3. Region of Murcia (1:109)
 4. Extremadura (1:118)
 5. Ceuta (1:125)
 6. Community of Madrid (1:130)

In Chile, the frequency of the surname was higher than national average (1:62) in the following regions:
 1. Maule Region (1:39)
 2. Bío Bío Region (1:49)
 3. Magallanes Region (1:55)
 4. Aysén Region (1:60)
 5. O'Higgins Region (1:60)
 6. Araucanía Region (1:62)

People
Adriana Muñoz (born 1948), Chilean politician
Adriana Muñoz (born 1982), Cuban middle-distance runner
Agustín Fernando Muñoz, Duke of Riánsares (1808–1873), second husband of Maria Christina, Regent of Spain
Agustín Muñoz Grandes (1896–1970), Spanish general, politician
Alejandro Muñoz-Alonso (1934–2016), Spanish politician
Alexander Muñoz (born 1979), Venezuelan professional boxer
Alfonso Pérez Muñoz (born 1972), Spanish retired footballer
Almudena Muñoz (born 1968), Spanish judo competitor
Alonso Muñoz (c. 1512 – 1568), high-ranking administrator in Spain
Amparo Muñoz (1954–2011), Spanish actress and Miss Universe
Anastasia Muñoz (born 1984), American voice actress
Andrés Muñoz (born 1999), Mexican MLB pitcher
Anfión Muñoz (1850–1920), Chilean political figure
Aníbal Muñoz Duque (1908–1987), Colombian Roman Catholic Cardinal and Archbishop
Anthony Muñoz (born 1958), NFL offensive tackle
Antonio Jesús Vázquez Muñoz (born 1980), Spanish footballer, commonly known as Jesús Vázquez
Antonio Muñoz (tennis) (born 1951), Spanish tennis player
Antonio Muñoz Molina (born 1956), Spanish writer
Arci Muñoz (born 1989), Filipina actress
Arnie Muñoz (born 1982), Dominican MLB pitcher
Arturo Muñoz (born 1984), Mexican footballer
Astrid Muñoz (born 1974), Puerto Rican model
Benito Muñoz, (born 1988), San Antonio, TX, retail and logistics 
Benjamín Muñoz Gamero (1817–1851), Chilean naval officer and politician
Bobby Muñoz (born 1968), Puerto Rican MLB baseball player
César Muñoz (1929–2000), Ecuadorian chess master
Carli Muñoz (born 1948), Puerto Rican jazz pianist
Carlos Muñoz (disambiguation), several people
Carlos Muñoz Pizarro (1913–1976), Chilean botanist
Cathy Muñoz (born 1964), member of the Alaska House of Representatives
Cecilia Muñoz (born 1962), American civil rights advocate
Cecilia Muñoz-Palma (1913–2006), first woman appointed to the Supreme Court of the Philippines
Celia Álvarez Muñoz (born 1937), American artist
Charles Muñoz (1926–2018), American poet, novelist and publisher
Cipriano Muñoz, 2nd Count of la Viñaza (1862–1933), Spanish diplomat and academic
Claudio Bravo Muñoz (born 1983), Chilean football goalkeeper
Claudio Muñoz (born 1984), Chilean football defender
Cristián Muñoz (born 1977), Argentine football goalkeeper
Cristian Muñoz (born 1981), Chilean race walker
Dandeny Muñoz Mosquera (born 1965), Colombian hitman, purported "chief assassin" for the Medellín Cartel
Dani Parejo Muñoz (born 1989), Spanish footballer
David Ibarra Muñoz (born 1930), Mexican economist and politician
David Muñoz (disambiguation), several people
Diego Muñoz Camargo (1529–1599), Mexican author of History of Tlaxcala
Edgar Muñoz (born 1983), Venezuelan boxer
Eduardo Muñoz Bachs (1937–2001), Cuban poster artist
Emilio Muñoz (born 1962), Spanish bullfighter and actor
Eunice Muñoz (1928–2022), Portuguese actress
Evaristo Muñoz (1684–1737), Spanish painter of the Baroque period
Evita Muñoz (1936–2016), Mexican actress
Faustino Sainz Muñoz (1937–2012), Spanish prelate of the Roman Catholic Church
Federico Muñoz (born 1963), Colombian road cyclist
Felipe Muñoz (born 1951), Mexican swimmer
Fernando Muñoz (born 1967), Spanish footballer, commonly known as Nando
Francisco José Ynduráin Muñoz (1940–2008), Spanish theoretical physicist
George Muñoz (born 1951), President of Muñoz Investment Banking Group, LLC
Guillermo Muñoz (born 1961), Mexican footballer
Gustavo Madero Muñoz (born 1955), Mexican politician and businessman
Héctor Martínez Muñoz (1924–1991), member of the Supreme Court of Puerto Rico
Heraldo Muñoz (born 1948), Chilean politician and diplomat
Hernán Darío Muñoz (born 1973), Colombian road racing cyclist
Hugo Muñoz (born 1973), Peruvian high jumper
Iñaki Muñoz (born 1978), Spanish footballer
Isabel Muñoz (born 1951), Spanish photographer
Iván Pérez Muñoz (born 1976), Spanish football striker
James Muñoz, lead singer of American metalcore band The Bled
Javier Muñoz (born 1995), Spanish footballer
Javier Muñoz (born 1980), Argentine-Spaniard footballer
Javiera Muñoz (1977–2018), Swedish singer with Chilean-Uruguayan roots
Joaquín Rubio y Muñoz (1788–1874), Spanish lawyer, antiquarian and numismatist
Jorge Antonio Muñoz (born 1981), Chilean football midfielder
José Muñoz (disambiguation), several people
Juan Bautista Muñoz (1745–1799), Spanish philosopher and historian
Juan Carlos Muñoz (1919–2009), Argentine footballer
Juan Jacinto Muñoz Rengel (born 1974), Spanish writer and founder of the literary review Estigma
Juan José Muñoz (1950–2013), Argentine businessman
Juan Manuel Muñoz (born 1985), Spanish footballer
Juan Muñoz (1953–2001), Spanish sculptor
Kitín Muñoz (born 1958), Spanish navigator and scientist
León Darío Muñoz (born 1977), Colombian footballer
Lucio Muñoz (1929–1998), Spanish painter
Luis Muñoz Marín (1898–1980), Puerto Rico's first democratically elected governor
Luis Muñoz Rivera (1859–1916), Puerto Rican poet, journalist and politician
Luis Muñoz Rivera (senator) (1916–2006)
Manolo Muñoz (1941–2000), Mexican singer and actor
Manuel Muñoz (disambiguation), several people
Maria Elizabeth Muñoz, Chicana activist
Mariana de Pineda Muñoz (1804–1831), Spanish national heroine
Mariela Muñoz (1943–2017), Argentine transsexual activist
Mark Muñoz (born 1978), Filipino-American mixed martial artist
Matilde Muñoz Sampedro (1900–1969), Spanish actress
Maritza Martin Munoz (1959–1993), American woman murdered during a news interview
Mercedes Negrón Muñoz (1895–1973), Puerto Rican poet
Miguel Ángel Muñoz (born 1983), Spanish actor and singer
Miguel Muñoz (1922–1990), Spanish footballer and manager
Moisés Muñoz (born 1980), Mexican football goalkeeper
Morella Muñoz (1935–1995), Venezuelan singer
Muñoz sisters: Lola, Lucía, Pilar and Rocío, members of the Spanish girl group Las Ketchup
Nicolás Muñoz (born 1981), Panamanian footballer
Nicole Muñoz (born 1994), Canadian film and television actress
Noe Muñoz (born 1967), MLB baseball catcher
Pablo Muñoz Vega S.J. (1903–1994), Ecuadorian Roman Catholic Cardinal and Archbishop
Paloma Muñoz (born 1965), visual artist, member of the group Martin & Muñoz
Pam Muñoz Ryan (born 1951), American Latina author
Pedro López Muñoz (born 1983), Spanish footballer
Pedro Muñoz (born 1968), MLB baseball outfielder
Pedro Muñoz Machín Rodríguez (born 1958), Spanish road bicycle racer
Pedro Muñoz Seca (1881–1936), Spanish dramatist
Pilar Muñoz (1911–1980), Spanish actress
Porfirio Muñoz Ledo (born 1933), Mexican politician
Rafael Muñoz (disambiguation), several people
Ramón Muñoz Gutiérrez (born 1960), Mexican right-wing politician
Raúl Muñoz (born 1975), Chilean footballer
René Muñoz (1938–2000), Cuban actor and scriptwriter
Ricardo Muñoz, Chicago alderman
Ricardo Muñoz Suay (1917–1997), Spanish film director, producer and screenwriter
Rodrigo Muñoz (born 1982), Uruguayan footballer
Roger Muñoz (born 1984), Nicaraguan basketball player
Rush (wrestler) (born 1988), full name William Arturo Muñoz González, Mexican wrestler
Santiago Muñoz (born 2002), Mexican footballer
Silvia Muñoz (born 1979), Spanish field hockey player
Susana Blaustein Muñoz, Argentine film director
Tito Muñoz (born 1983), American conductor
Toni Muñoz (born 1982), Spanish football striker
Víctor Muñoz (disambiguation), several people
Victoria Muñoz Mendoza (born 1940), Puerto Rican politician
Vincent Phillip Muñoz, American political scientist
Xisco Muñoz (born 1980), Spanish former footballer and manager
Yairo Muñoz (born 1995), Dominican baseball player
Zahid Muñoz (born 2001), Mexican footballer
Zulina Muñoz (born 1987), Mexican boxer

See also
Gutierre-Muñoz, municipality in Spain
Hoyos de Miguel Muñoz, municipality in Spain
Luis Muñoz Marín International Airport, public airport in Puerto Rico
Luis Muñoz Rivera Park, national park in Puerto Rico
Luis Muñoz Rivera (Ponce statue), in Puerto Rico
Martín Muñoz de la Dehesa, municipality in Spain
Martín Muñoz de las Posadas, municipality in Spain
Miguel Muñoz Trophy, Spanish football award
Muñoz Airstrip, dirt airstrip in Baja California, Mexico
Muñoz Gamero Peninsula, peninsula in Chile
Muñoz Municipality, municipality in Venezuela
Muñoz, Nueva Ecija, officially the Science City of Muñoz, Philippines
Patio Muñoz, neighborhood in the city of Xalapa, Mexico
Pedro Muñoz, municipality in Spain
San Muñoz, municipality in Spain
Veterans Village (Muñoz, locally), a district of Quezon City, Philippines

References

Spanish-language surnames
Basque-language surnames
Patronymic surnames
Surnames of Chilean origin
Surnames of Colombian origin